Humberto Ghizzo Bortoluzzi Regional Airport , also known as Jaguaruna Regional Airport, serves the cities of Jaguaruna, Criciúma and the southern region of Santa Catarina, Brazil.

History
The airport was commissioned on 27 April 2015.

Airlines and destinations

Access

See also

List of airports in Brazil

References

External links

Airports in Santa Catarina (state)
Airports established in 2015